Harry Richard Curtis (3 October 1892 – 31 March 1968) was an Australian rules footballer who played for Carlton and Collingwood in the VFL.

Biography
Curtis started his career as a ruckman at Carlton, the club his older brother, Charles Ernest Curtis (1878-1959), had played for. 

He could only manage two senior appearances in the 1913 season and the following year debuted for Collingwood. Although he was a ruckman in Collingwood's losing 1915 Grand Final side, he was used mostly by the club as a centre half-forward. It was in that position that he played in both the 1917 and 1919 premierships at Collingwood. He was one of the key players in the 1917 Grand Final with three goals and played in another losing Grand Final in 1920.

In 1923, his final season, Curtis captained the Magpies before retiring due to business commitments. He served at Collingwood's president from 1924 to 1950, a record stretch by a president of any VFL/AFL club. In 2007 he was inducted into Collingwood's Hall of Fame.

References

Holmesby, Russell and Main, Jim (2007). The Encyclopedia of AFL Footballers. 7th ed. Melbourne: Bas Publishing.

External links

1892 births
1968 deaths
People educated at Wesley College (Victoria)
Australian Rules footballers: place kick exponents
Carlton Football Club players
Collingwood Football Club players
Collingwood Football Club Premiership players
Collingwood Football Club administrators
Australian rules footballers from Melbourne
Two-time VFL/AFL Premiership players
People from Carlton, Victoria